New England Compounding Center (NECC) was a compounding pharmacy founded in 1998. Based in Framingham, Massachusetts, NECC was a family-run business owned by Barry J. Cadden, his wife, Lisa Cadden (née Conigliaro) and her brother Gregory Conigliaro.

2012 fungal infection scandal 

The company became the center of a scandal resulting from a meningitis outbreak that started on May 21, 2012 and is linked to 76 deaths.  NECC recalled more than 2,000 products after distributing 17,000 vials of methylprednisolone for injection contaminated with fungi to 23 states.

Food and Drug Administration (FDA) regulations dictate that compounding pharmacies like NECC combine, mix, or alter ingredients only to create specific drugs for individual patients. Massachusetts state regulators reported NECC was licensed only to prepare individual patient prescriptions. The company, however, shipped drugs to multiple states, and may have been operating outside of their legal boundaries, authorities said. Doctors, hospitals, and clinics had turned to compounding pharmacies like NECC because they often charge much lower prices than the major manufacturers.

On December 21, 2012, the company filed for Chapter 11 bankruptcy, listing less than $2.34 million in debts. Following the bankruptcy, a Reuters investigation into financial filings revealed company payments exceeding $22 million to the top executives and private equity investors in 2012.

References

External links

Companies based in Framingham, Massachusetts
Pharmaceutical companies of the United States
Pharmaceutical companies established in 1998
Companies that filed for Chapter 11 bankruptcy in 2012
Health care companies based in Massachusetts